The 2021 Eliteserien was the 77th completed season of top-tier football in Norway. This was fifth season of Eliteserien as rebranding from Tippeligaen.

The season was originally scheduled to begin on 5 April and end on 27 November 2021, not including play-off matches. Restrictions enforced by the government due to the COVID-19 pandemic forced the Norwegian Football Federation to postpone the start several times and the league started on 9 May 2021. The last round was played on 12 December 2021.

Bodø/Glimt were the defending champions. Tromsø and Lillestrøm joined as the promoted clubs from the 2020 Norwegian First Division. They replaced Aalesund and IK Start who were relegated to the 2021 Norwegian First Division.

Teams
Sixteen teams competed in the league – the top fourteen teams from the previous season, and two teams promoted from Norwegian First Division. The promoted teams were Tromsø and Lillestrøm, both returning to the top flight after an absence of just one year. They replaced Aalesund and IK Start, both relegated after a season's presence.

Stadiums and locations

Note: Table lists in alphabetical order.

Personnel and kits

Managerial changes

Transfers

Winter

Summer

League table

Positions by round

Results

 Relegation play-offs 

The 14th-placed team in the Eliteserien, Brann, played against the winners of the First Division promotion play-offs, Jerv, on neutral ground to decide who would play in the Eliteserien next season.4–4 after extra time. Jerv won 8–7 on penalties and were promoted to the Eliteserien; Brann were relegated to the Norwegian First Division.''

Season statistics

Top scorers

Hat-tricks

Notes
4 Player scored 4 goals(H) – Home team(A) – Away team

Top assists

Clean sheets

Discipline

Player

Most yellow cards: 8
 Lars Ranger (Lillestrøm)

Most red cards: 1

 Adam Andersson (Rosenborg)
 Martin Bjørnbak (Molde)
 David Brekalo (Viking)
 Patrik Gunnarsson (Viking)
 Kornelius Normann Hansen (Stabæk)
 Markus Henriksen (Rosenborg)
 Anders Jenssen (Tromsø)
 Fredrik Pallesen Knudsen (Brann)
 Ibrahima Koné (Sarpsborg 08)
 Alioune Ndour (Haugesund)
 Igoh Ogbu (Lillestrøm)
 Birk Risa (Molde)
 Anton Salétros (Sarpsborg 08)
 Marcus Sandberg (Stabæk)
 Ian Smeulers (Sandefjord)
 Albin Sporrong (Mjøndalen)
 Gustav Valsvik (Strømsgodset)

Club

Most yellow cards: 53
Sarpsborg 08
Stabæk

Most red cards: 2
Molde
Rosenborg
Sarpsborg 08
Stabæk
Viking

Awards

Monthly awards

Annual awards

League attendances

See also
 2021–22 Norwegian Football Cup

References

Eliteserien seasons
1
Norway
Norway
Eliteserien